Green Hills Engineering College is an engineering college situated in Kumarhatti, Solan district of Himachal Pradesh.

History 

The College was established in 2003 with affiliation from Himachal Pradesh University. It started with four core branches, Electrical Engineering, Computer Science & Engineering, Mechanical Engineering and Electronics & Communication Engineering. In 2008 it added Information Technology. In 2010, Civil Engineering was added.

In 2016 it merged its Information Technology course with Computer Science & Engineering.

Academics

Affiliations 

The College is affiliated to Himachal Pradesh Technical University and Himachal Pradesh University. The college received the approval of All India Council for Technical Education in 2003. It received candidacy status from International Accreditation Organization (U.S.A.).

Academic programmes

Bachelor's in Technology
The college offers 4 year courses in:
 Civil Engineering
 Computer Science & Engineering
 Electrical Engineering
 Electronics & Communication Engineering
 Mechanical Engineering

Master's in Technology
The college offers 2 year courses in:
 Mechanical Engineering 
 Electronics & Communication Engineering

Recognition

 International Accreditation Organization (United States of America) granted Candidacy Status.
 College Chairman Sh. Kirpal Singh Pasricha received the "Best Entrepreneur Award" in India from Minister Shashi Tharoor on 15 February 2013 from "Engineering Watch".
 The College was awarded the Best Engineering College in Himachal Pradesh by the Himalayan Research Scholar Association.
 GHEC ranked 2nd among top emerging engineering colleges in India, and ranked 1st among private colleges in Himachal Pradesh (CSR-GHRDC 2010 Survey of Engineering Colleges)

Infrastructure 
The College has ISO 9001:2008 certification for its infrastructure. It offers the following educational and additional facilities:

External links
 

Engineering colleges in Himachal Pradesh
Education in Solan district
Educational institutions established in 2003
2003 establishments in Himachal Pradesh